Nike Flywire is a thread, composed of vectran or nylon, developed by Nike to minimize weight and maximize support, and used in the upper part of a sneaker. Shoes containing Flywire became available for consumer purchase in 2008.

Development
Flywire was created by Jay Meschter, Director of Innovation at Nike. He began by taking a last (an object shaped like a foot used to design shoes) and marking the key points of where a shoe needs to support the foot.  When Meschter saw an embroidery machine, he determined the machine could be used to make long stitches. Long stitches allow lightweight fibers to support the foot in key points, instead of using layers of material that support the whole foot. This idea was pioneered by Adi Dassler in 1949, when he added 3 reinforcing stripes to his canvas Adidas running shoe.

Design
The goal of the design is to help and support the foot using the lightest and strongest material possible, Vectran.  The Flywire design (threads placed in key parts of the upper) prevents the foot from slipping when running. Flywire is also a minimalist idea (the idea that items should only contain necessities), since the upper only contains the fundamental features.  This allows the maximum amount of energy to be moved forward each stride.

Vectran
 
Nike adapts Vectran fibers, which are produced by Kuraray, into embroidery threads, before use in the shoe.  Vectran fibers are thinner than human hair, and relatively inexpensive.  Vectran is lightweight, flexible, and high in tensile strength, the stress at which material deforms (five times stronger than steel), which makes it an ideal component for synthetic fibers.  Vectran has also been used by NASA and in bicycle tires, among other things.

Support
Nike designed Flywire with inspiration from a suspension bridge, where many cables provide support.  This allows support to be placed where necessary, especially in the forefoot (metatarsus and toes) and heel. The cables are designed to wrap around the foot like tendons.  Since the support does not come from layers of material, the shoe is also more flexible.  The only layers of material on the shoe are in place to prevent dirt and rocks from reaching the foot.

Weight
Due to the Vectran fibers, shoes containing Nike Flywire weigh as little as 93 grams, "approximately the weight of a Snickers bar with a bite missing."  There is little excess weight because the upper is very thin, and the Vectran fibers are only added where support is needed.  Shoe weight can be reduced up to 50% through the use of Flywire.  Track spikes (running shoes with spikes added for traction) containing Flywire are now lighter than Michael Johnson's famous Golden Shoes of the 1996 Summer Olympics in Atlanta, Georgia.  These spikes are so light that athletes claim they are like "a second skin" or "spikes coming out of their feet."  This is a goal that Bill Bowerman tried to achieve as co-founder of Nike and a spike designer.

Shoes
Many Nike shoes contain Flywire. These shoes are designed for a variety of activities and sports, including running, athletics, basketball, badminton, football, American Football, baseball and tennis. The athletics shoes were debuted at the 2007 World Championships at Osaka, while the rest made their first appearance at the 2008 Summer Olympics, in Beijing, China, though all are now available for consumer purchase.

References

External links
 

Shoes
Nike, Inc.